Obrint Pas ("Breaking Through") was a Spanish band from Valencia, Valencian Community. Their music is a mixture of rock, ska and reggae with dolçaina rhythms, a traditional Valencian instrument, often with social and political lyrics promoting Catalan nationalism.

History
Obrint Pas was formed in 1993. One year later, in 1994 they recorded their first tape which took them to the III Tirant de Rock. During the following years, the band also took part in several festivals that helped them to consolidate their music.

Their first album came in 1997 with the title La revolta de l'ànima. 3 years later, came Obrint Pas (2000), their first album with the record label Propaganda pel Fet. The consolidation of the group came with Terra in 2003, trying new styles. Just a year later, they recorded La Flama (2004) which launched them onto the international scene with gigs in Germany, Switzerland, the Netherlands, Morocco and the Western Sahara. 

Their last work En Moviment (2005) is a Live album with many collaborations such as the likes of Alex from Inadaptats, Fermin Muguruza, Al Tall and many more. It was recorded in a tributing gig to Ovidi Montllor in Valencia ten years after his death. This work reached the charts in Spain (The only group singing in Catalan).

2006 Internacionalista Tour onwards
In 2006, the band undertook an international tour that was called 2006 Internacionalista Tour and included England, Norway, Czech Republic, and Argentina.

In 2007, the band released their 5th studio album Benvingut al Paradís (Catalan for Welcome to Paradise). The artwork features Muhammad Ali. In the same year, two valencian journalists Antoni Rubio and Hèctor Sanjuan published Del Sud. El País Valencià al ritme dels Obrint Pas. The book is based on the story of the band and the 15 last years of the Valencian region.

World record Lipdubbing
On 24 October 2010, in the city of Vic, the music of Obrint Pas was used in a world record attempt to get the largest lipdub ever. It succeeded with 5771 participants. The background music used was La flama, a song from 2004.

Members
 Xavi Sarrià - Guitar & vocals
 Jaume Guerra - Bass
 Miquel Gironès - Dolçaina, vocals, drum
 Marc Guardiola - Drum
 Robert Fernández - Guitar
 Miquel Ramos - Vocals & Keyboards

Discography
 La revolta de l'ànima - 1997
 Obrint Pas - 2000
 Terra - 2002
 La flama - 2004
 En Moviment! (Live album) + Un Poble en Moviment! (Live DVD) - 2005
 Benvingut al Paradís (CD) + Assaltant el Paradís (DVD) - 2007
 Coratge (CD and book) - 2011

References

External links
 Obrint Pas on myspace 
 Official webpage 
 Propaganda pel Fet 
 Page of Obrint Pas  

Valencian music
Catalan music
Musicians from the Valencian Community
Spanish hardcore punk groups
Spanish ska groups
Musical groups disestablished in 2013